Julien Fritz (born 10 January 1990) is a French rugby union player. His position is Centre and he currently plays for USA Perpignan in the Top 14. He began his career with Lyon OU before moving to USA Perpignan in 2010. His brother is the French international Florian Fritz.

References

1990 births
Living people
Sportspeople from Sens
French rugby union players
USA Perpignan players
Rugby union centres